The 1959 NCAA Skiing Championships were contested in Winter Park, Colorado at the sixth annual NCAA-sanctioned ski tournament to determine the individual and team national champions of men's collegiate alpine skiing, cross-country skiing, and ski jumping in the United States.

Colorado, coached by Bob Beattie, captured their first national championship, edging out rival Denver in the team standings.

The sole repeat individual champion was Denver's Clarence Servold, in cross country.

Venue

This year's championships were held March 27–29 in Colorado at Winter Park, west of Denver.

These were the second NCAA championships at Winter Park (and in Colorado), which previously hosted in 1956.

Team scoring

Individual events
Four events were held, which yielded seven individual titles.
Friday: Slalom
Saturday: Downhill, Cross Country
Sunday: Jumping

See also
List of NCAA skiing programs

References

NCAA Skiing Championships
NCAA Skiing Championships
NCAA Skiing Championships
NCAA Skiing Championships
NCAA Skiing Championships
NCAA Skiing Championships
NCAA Skiing Championships
Skiing in Colorado